The Greater Cleveland Film Commission (GCFC) is a 501(c)(3) private non-profit organization, also known as the Greater Cleveland Media Development Corporation. Its purpose is to bring jobs and economic impact to Northeast Ohio through the growth of a sustainable media production industry. It attempts this through a program of attraction, advocacy, and workforce development.

History 
The Greater Cleveland Film Commission was founded in 1998 by its first President, Chris Carmody. Early on, the city attracted several independent productions like Welcome to Collinwood, Antwone Fisher and American Splendor. However, in the mid-2000s, it became readily apparent that for Cleveland, and Ohio, to compete with other states, a tax incentive would need to be implemented to lure productions away from other more established production centers.

In 2006, Ivan Schwarz was named the new president and CEO of GCFC. Schwarz began the long process of lobbying for some sort of financial incentive for the media industry in Ohio. In 2009, Ohio passed the Ohio Motion Picture Tax Credit, largely due to the efforts of Schwarz and GCFC.

In fact, in the summer of 2011, Cleveland hosted four feature film productions at the same time: Marvel's The Avengers, Alex Cross, Fun Size and Tomorrow You're Gone. Since 2009, nearly 200 productions have filmed in Northeast Ohio.

Notable Films/Television made in Cleveland and Northeast Ohio

 25 Hill
 Against the Ropes
 Air Force One
 Alex Cross
 All the Marbles
 American Splendor
 Antwone Fisher
 The Avengers
 The Biggest Loser
 Captain America: The Winter Soldier
 The Charnel House
 Christmas at Maxwell's
 A Christmas Story
 Cleveland vs. Wall Street
 Dateline NBC
 The Deer Hunter
 Diary of a Hitman
 Double Dragon
 Draft Day
 Edge of Seventeen
 The Escape Artist
 Extreme Makeover: Home Edition
 Flattered
 The Fortune Cookie
 Freerunner
 Fun Size
 The Great Food Truck Race
 Harry and Walter go to New York
Hoarders
 House Arrest
 House Hunters
 The Instructor
 The Kid from Cleveland
 The Kings of Summer
 Liberal Arts
 Light of Day
 Lilith
 Little Evil
 Made in Cleveland
 Major League
 Miracle Dogs
 My Friend Dahmer
 NBA on TNT
 The Nightowls of Coventry
 The Oh in Ohio
 One Potato, Two Potato
One-Trick Pony
 Pieces
 Proximity
 The Rainmaker
 Renegade Force
 Running America
 The Shawshank Redemption
 The Soloist
 Spider-Man 3
 Stranger Than Paradise
 Sugar Wars
 My Summer Story
 Take Shelter
 Tango & Cash
 Telling Lies in America
 The Fate of The Furious
 Those Lips, Those Eyes
 Turn of Faith
 Unstoppable
 Uptight
 Welcome Home, Roxy Carmichael
 Welcome to Collinwood
 The Year that Trembled

References

Film organizations in the United States
1998 establishments in Ohio
Organizations based in Cleveland
Film commissions in the United States
Organizations established in 1998
Cinema of Cleveland